David Blain (August 12, 1832 – May 6, 1909) was a Scottish-born Canadian lawyer, teacher and political figure. He represented York West in the House of Commons of Canada from 1872 to 1878 as a Liberal member.

He was born near Ayr, the son of John Blain and Elizabeth McCutcheon, and came to Canada West with his parents in 1842. He was educated in Scotland and at the University of Toronto. Blain was called to the bar in 1860 and set up practice in Toronto, partnering for a time with Albert Prince. In 1867, he married Eliza Harrington. He retired from the practice of law in 1868. Blain was defeated in a bid for reelection in 1878. He retired from politics afterwards, and died in Toronto at the age of 76 in 1909.

References 

1832 births
1909 deaths
Liberal Party of Canada MPs
Members of the House of Commons of Canada from Ontario